Ji Eon-hak (born 22 March 1994), known as Álvaro in Spain, is a South Korean footballer who plays for Gimcheon Sangmu FC as a left winger.

Football career
Eon-hak was born in Gumi, North Gyeongsang, and began his footballing career at Club Internacional de la Amistad. In October 2013 he moved to CD Cristo Atlético,

Eon-hak joined AD Alcorcón on 25 June 2014, being assigned to the reserves also in the fourth level. He was presented on 2 July, and made his debut for the Madrid side's first team on 11 September, starting in a 0–1 away loss against CD Lugo, for the season's Copa del Rey.

References

External links

1995 births
Living people
People from Gumi, North Gyeongsang
South Korean footballers
Association football wingers
Tercera División players
AD Alcorcón B players
AD Alcorcón footballers
Korea National League players
Incheon United FC players
South Korean expatriate footballers
South Korean expatriate sportspeople in Spain
Expatriate footballers in Spain
Sportspeople from North Gyeongsang Province